Make Me Lose Control may refer to:

"Make Me Lose Control" (song), a 1988 single by Eric Carmen
Make Me Lose Control (Grey's Anatomy), a 2005 television episode